Multiple countries declared war on Germany over time, including:

World War I

, which became a fierce struggle in the National Assembly, 14 August 1917
French declaration of war on Germany (1914), 3 August 1914
Russian declaration of war on Germany (1914), 7 August 1914
United Kingdom declaration of war on Germany (1914), automatically including all dominions, colonies, etc. of the British Empire including Canada, Australia, and British India, 4 August 1914
United States declaration of war on Germany (1917), 6 April 1917

World War II
Canadian declaration of war on Germany, 10 September 1939
French declaration of war on Germany (1939), 3 September 1939
United Kingdom declaration of war on Germany (1939),  3 September 1939
United States declaration of war on Germany (1941), 11 December 1941

See also
German declaration of war against the United States